Job Lot is a studio album by Chas & Dave, released in December 1982 on the band's own Rockney label.

Background and reception
A "job lot" is a Cockney/working class term for assorted items sold together, such as at a market or boot fair. This reflects the mixture of the songs on the album.

Reviewing the band's 2015 album Live at Rockplast, for Record Collector magazine, Max Bell wrote: "Of particular interest to the connoisseur is the dusting down of "Stop Dreaming" and "Word From Anne", from the then-current Job Lot, a disc so in touch with its native land it made Morrissey seem positively parochial."

Track listing 
 "That Old Piano"	
 "That's What I Like"	
 "London Girls"	
 "Give It Some Stick, Mick"	
 "No-Body"	
 "Flying"	
 "Margate"	
 "Mustn't Grumble"	
 "Word from Anne"	
 "Stop Dreaming"	
 "Give It Gavotte"	
 "Wish I Could Write a Love Song"

Personnel

Musicians 
Guitar, keyboards, vocals – Chas Hodges
Bass, violin, vocals - Dave Peacock
Drums – Mick Burt
Leader (strings) – Gavyn Wright 
Strings – Martyn Ford Orchestra

Technical
Producers - Chas & Dave
Arrangers - Chas & Dave
Strings arranger - Chas Hodges
Management – Bob England 
Mastering – Tone

References

1982 albums
Chas & Dave albums